The Public Utilities Commission of the State of Colorado (PUC) provides regulatory oversight of public utilities in the State of Colorado of the United States.

The Colorado PUC consists of a director and three commissioners appointed by the Governor of Colorado and confirmed by the Colorado State Senate.  The incumbent commissioners are:
Eric Blank, Chairman, 2021-2025
Megan Gilman, Commissioner, 2020-2024
John C. Gavan, Commissioner, 2019-2023

The director is Doug Dean.

Fixed utilities regulated by the Colorado PUC include electric power utilities, natural gas utilities, intrastate natural gas pipelines, district heating utilities, drinking water utilities, and telecommunications utilities.

Transportation utilities regulated by the Colorado PUC include railroads, taxis, limousines, shuttles, charters, and sightseeing carriers.

The Public Utilities Commission is an independent constitutional commission which operates within the Colorado Department of Regulatory Agencies (DORA).

See also
Government of Colorado
Public utilities commission
Public utility
State of Colorado

References

External links
 Colorado Public Utilities Commission

Public Utilities Commission
Colorado